Alan Stephen Williams, SM (born 15 March 1951) is an English Roman Catholic prelate and 7th Bishop of Brentwood. He is a member of the Marist Order.

Career
Born in Lancashire in 1951, Alan Williams trained for the priesthood at Allen Hall before which he obtained a Degree in Psychology from Durham University, followed by a PhD in Psychology from London University. He later earned a degree in Theology from the University of Cambridge, and a master's degree in Education from Hull University.

He made his final vows with Society of Mary (Marists) in 1981 and was ordained priest on the 30 April 1983 at St Anne’s, Whitechapel. Williams served as a school teacher and as Catholic chaplain to Sheffield Hallam University. He was subsequently parish priest at St Lawrence of Canterbury, Sidcup. He is a former major Superior of the Marist Fathers in England, a post he held from 2000 to 2008  He has also taught Christian Spirituality at postgraduate level. Williams was Appointed Director of the Roman Catholic National Shrine at Walsingham in 2008  where he had overall responsibility for pilgrimage and retreat work. He was appointed the 7th Bishop of Brentwood 14 April 2014 and consecrated on 1st July 2014 by Cardinal Vincent Nichols.

Coat of Arms

References

External links

1951 births
Living people
20th-century English Roman Catholic priests
21st-century English Roman Catholic priests
Roman Catholic bishops of Brentwood
Clergy from Lancashire
Alumni of the University of Hull
Alumni of the University of Cambridge
Alumni of Grey College, Durham
English Roman Catholic bishops